The blockade of the Gaza Strip is the ongoing land, air, and sea blockade of the Gaza Strip imposed by Israel and Egypt temporarily in 2005–2006 and permanently from 2007 onwards, following the Israeli disengagement from Gaza.
 
The blockade was made permanent after Hamas took control of the Gaza Strip during the Battle of Gaza, seizing government institutions and replacing Fatah and other Palestinian Authority (PA) officials with Hamas members. Earlier, after Hamas won elections and formed the PA government in March 2006, led by Ismail Haniya, Israel and the  Quartet on the Middle East set conditions before they would continue to provide aid to the PA or have any dialogue with any member of a Hamas-led PA government. These conditions were: recognition of Israel, disavowal of violent actions, and acceptance of previous agreements between Israel and the PA, including the Oslo Accords. Hamas refused to accept these conditions and aid to the PA was stopped and sanctions against the PA imposed.

When Hamas took over Gaza, Egypt and Israel largely closed their border crossings with Gaza, on the grounds that Fatah and PA forces had fled the Strip and were no longer able to provide security on the Palestinian side. Egypt was worried that Hamas control of Gaza would increase Iranian influence. Egyptian Foreign Minister Aboul Gheit also explained that opening the Rafah border crossing, the only crossing on the Egypt-Gaza border,  would undermine the legitimacy of the PA. Israel said that the blockade was necessary to protect Israeli citizens from "terrorism, rocket attacks and any other hostile activity" and to prevent dual use goods from entering Gaza.

Israel has been accused of violating or failing to fulfil specific obligations it had committed to under various ceasefire agreements on different occasions to alleviate or lift the blockade. "Crossings were repeatedly shut and buffer zones were reinstated. Imports declined, exports were blocked, and fewer Gazans were given exit permits to Israel and the West Bank." PA President Mahmoud Abbas has expressed his approval of the Egyptian border restrictions. In 2014 and subsequent years, Abbas supported Egypt's crackdown on smuggling tunnels, and welcomed the flooding of the tunnels by Egypt in coordination with the PA.

Background 
In 1994, Israel built the Gaza–Israel barrier as a security measure to stop the infiltration of terrorists, including suicide bombers, into Israel. There are four border crossings between Israel and the Gaza Strip through the barrier: the Kerem Shalom, Karni, Erez, and Sufa crossings. All goods bound for Gaza as well as exports passing through Israel must use one of these crossings, and undergo security inspection before being permitted to enter or leave Gaza. In 2005, Israel withdrew its settlers and forces from the Gaza Strip.

Additionally, starting in 2009, Egypt built an underground Egypt-Gaza barrier along the Egypt-Gaza border. The stated aim was to block smuggling tunnels. The Rafah Border Crossing is the only lawful crossing point between Egypt and Gaza, and was manned by PA security forces and the European Union Border Assistance Mission Rafah. All humanitarian and other supplies passing through Israel or Egypt must pass through these crossings after security inspection.

Until 2013, there were hundreds of smuggling tunnels dug under the Egypt-Gaza border to smuggle goods, including fuel, into Gaza to bypass the blockade.

2005-2006 blockades
On 12 September 2005, the final day of the Israeli withdrawal, international politicians such as France's Foreign Minister Philippe Douste-Blazy and Jordan's Deputy Prime Minister Marwan Muasher warned of Gaza being turned into an open-air prison. Four days later, Mahmoud Abbas stated to the UN General Assembly: "It is incumbent upon Israel to turn this unilateral withdrawal into a positive step in a real way.We must quickly resolve all outstanding major issues, including the Rafah border crossing with Egypt, the airport and the seaport, as well as the establishment of a direct link between the Gaza Strip and the West Bank. Without this, Gaza will remain a huge prison."

Following the disengagement, human rights groups alleged that Israel frequently blockaded Gaza in order to apply pressure on the population "in response to political developments or attacks by armed groups in Gaza on Israeli civilians or soldiers". The special envoy of the Quartet James Wolfensohn noted that "Gaza had been effectively sealed off from the outside world since the Israeli disengagement [August–September 2005], and the humanitarian and economic consequences for the Palestinian population were profound. There were already food shortages. Palestinian workers and traders to Israel were unable to cross the border".

On 15 January 2006, the Karni crossing – the sole point for exports of goods from Gaza – was closed completely for all kinds of exports. The greenhouse project suffered a huge blow, as the harvest of high-value crops, meant to be exported for Europe via Israel, was essentially lost (with a small part of the harvest donated to local institutions). Moreover, closing of Karni cut off the so-far resilient textile and furniture industries in Gaza from their source of income. Starting February 2006, the Karni crossing was sporadically open for exports, but the amount of goods allowed to be exported was minuscule compared to the amount of goods imported (which, in turn, barely supported Gaza's needs). Between 1 January and 11 May, more than 12,700 tonnes of produce were harvested in Gaza's greenhouses, almost all of it destined for export; out of it, only 1,600 tonnes (less than 13%) were actually exported.

Sanctions on Hamas-led PA governments
The election for the Palestinian Legislative Council took place on 25 January 2006, and was decisively won by Hamas. The election took place during a full blockade of Gaza. After the PLC was sworn in on 18 February 2006, in addition to its blockade of the Gaza Strip, Israel imposed other sanctions on the PA, including withholding the PA's tax revenue (collected by Israel on the PA's behalf), and imposing travel restrictions on Hamas PLC members. Israel's position is that Hamas is a terrorist organisation that has vowed to destroy Israel, and is responsible for the death of hundreds of its citizens, and neither wanted to have any direct relations with the other. On 20 February, Hamas leader Ismail Haniya was nominated to form a new PA government, which was sworn in on 29 March.

Besides Israel's position in relation to a Hamas-led PA government, following the election, the Quartet on the Middle East had stated that continued aid to and dialogue with the PA under a Hamas government was conditional on Hamas agreeing to three conditions: recognition of Israel, the disavowal of violent actions, and acceptance of previous agreements between Israel and the PA, including the Oslo Accords. Haniya refused to accept these conditions, and the Quartet stopped all dialogue with the PA and especially any member of the Hamas government, ceased providing aid to the PA and imposed sanctions against the PA under Hamas. Though initially opposed by the United States, a Quartet member, the US government agreed in April 2006 to discontinue $400 million of foreign aid to the PA. Instead the US redirected $100 million to the United Nations and other non-Palestinian groups, but no aid money was given directly to the government of Mahmoud Abbas.

As noted by Wolfensohn (and also in an EU paper), withholding of the PA's own tax revenue – an action taken by Israel alone, not by the Quartet – was more damaging than the ceasing of international aid to the PA. These taxes, collected in Palestine (both in the West Bank and Gaza) by Israeli authorities, were supposed to be transferred to the PA's budget. By releasing or withholding these revenues, Israel was able, in the words of the International Crisis Group, to "virtually turn the Palestinian economy on and off". Israel withheld these transfers from the PA until June 2007. Withholding the tax revenue by Israel meant that the PA lacked money to pay its employees, including the police, further destabilizing the situation in Gaza.

In March 2007, Fatah agreed to join Hamas in a PA unity government, also headed by Haniya. Shortly after, in June, Hamas took control of the Gaza Strip during the Battle of Gaza, seizing PA government institutions in the Strip and replacing Fatah and other PA officials with Hamas members.

Following the takeover, besides other measures, Israel and Egypt closed the Gaza border crossings, marking the start of the blockade of the Gaza Strip. Meanwhile, in the West Bank, President Mahmoud Abbas officially dissolved the Haniya-led PA government, suspended parts of the Basic Law, and created a new PA government by decree, without approval of the PLC. This government was recognized by the international community, and international relations and aid to the PA government in the West Bank resumed, the economic sanctions were lifted, and Israel resumed the transfer of tax revenue to it.

PA support of blockade 
Linked with the conflict following his party's loss in the 2006 election, Palestinian President Mahmoud Abbas approved the Egyptian border restrictions by the new regime, purportedly aimed at protecting Egypt from danger. In 2014 and subsequent years, Abbas supported Egypt's crackdown on smuggling tunnels and welcomed the flooding of the tunnels by Egypt in coordination with the PA.

In 2010, Abbas declared that he opposed lifting the Israeli naval blockade of the Gaza Strip because this would bolster Hamas. Egypt also supported this position.

In 2016, Abbas objected to the entrance of Qatari fuel to the Gaza electricity plant via Israel, because his PA would be unable to collect taxes on the fuel.

In 2016 most Palestinian parties welcomed Turkish initiatives to end the strict Israeli siege on the Gaza Strip by building a seaport for the movement of people and goods. This step was condemned by Fatah and the PA, a senior Fatah leader saying that his movement would not allow this to happen, while the Fatah Executive Committee said this was an Israeli trick to separate Gaza from the West Bank. In turn a Hamas official condemned the PA's position; "This position proves that the PA is part of the Israeli-led siege which has been imposed on Gaza for ten years".

In 2017, the PA government imposed its own sanctions against Gaza, including, among other things, cutting off salaries to thousands of PA employees, as well as financial assistance to hundreds of families in the Gaza Strip. The PA initially said it would stop paying for the electricity and fuel that Israel supplies to the Gaza Strip, but after a year partially backtracked.

Funding and aid
In 2017, the PA government imposed sanctions against the Hamas-ruled Gaza Strip, including ceasing to pay salaries to thousands of civil servants in Gaza, as well as financial assistance to families in the Gaza Strip. Since 2018, Qatar has been providing funding for Palestinians in Gaza. In February 2021, with Israeli approval, Qatar agreed to pay $360 million for the year to pay for fuel for Gaza's power plant, pay civil servants and provide aid to tens of thousands of impoverished families.

After the 11-day Gaza War in May 2021, Israel stopped the Qatari money coming into Gaza out of concern that it would be diverted to Hamas for military purposes. In July 2021, it was reported that the United Nations had agreed to oversee the distribution of the Qatari money to Gazans through banks affiliated with the Palestinian Monetary Authority in Ramallah. Israel agreed to the arrangement on condition that none of the money is diverted to Hamas. However, as of 5 July, payment of Hamas salaries has delayed the resumption of the Qatari funding, because the channel for paying them is through the Palestinian Authority, which does not want to pay salaries to anyone affiliated with Hamas. The PA banks are refusing to take part, fearing that their cooperation would expose them to legal actions for supporting and funding terrorism. On 19 August, the United Nations and Qatar signed an agreement for the resumption of Qatari cash payments to 100,000 needy Gazans. It does not cover cash payments to Hamas employees. Palestinian sources said that Hamas has enough money to pay its civil servants until the end of the year. The PA pulled out of the agreement on 10 September in relation to salaries of public servants, holding up distribution of all Qatari funds.

On 16 August 2021, Israel seized 23 tons of chocolate intended for import to Gaza and suspected for use by Hamas as an alternative currency to finance its operations.

Impact
The worsening economic and humanitarian situation raised great concern abroad. According to the UN Conference on Trade and Development (UNCTAD), in January 2003, the Israeli blockade and closures had drained as much as US$2.4 billion out of the economy of the West Bank and the Gaza Strip.

Throughout 2006, the Karni crossing was only partially operational, costing Palestinians $500,000 a day, as less than 10% of the Gaza Strip's minimal daily export targets were achieved. Basic food commodities were severely depleted, bakeries closed and food rationing was introduced.

The World Bank estimated in 2015 that the GDP losses caused by the blockade since 2007 was above 50%, and entailed large welfare losses. Gaza's manufacturing sector, once significant, shrunk by as much as 60% in real terms, due to the wars in the past 20 years and the blockade. Gaza's exports virtually disappeared since the imposition of the 2007 blockade. It stated that "solutions have to be found to enable faster inflow of construction materials into Gaza", while taking into account "legitimate security concerns of neighboring countries."

In May 2015, the World Bank reported that the Gaza economy was on the "verge of collapse". 40% of Gaza's population lived in poverty, even though around 80% received some sort of aid. It said the restrictions had to be eased to allow construction materials "to enter in sufficient quantities" and to allow exports. "The economy cannot survive without being connected to the outside world", The World Bank said the tightened restrictions meant the construction sector's output was reduced by 83%.

Movement of people

Because of the widespread violence within Israel during the Second Intifada that began in September 2000, Israel closed all entry points between Israel and the Palestinian territories, including the Gaza Strip, and closed the Gaza International Airport. On 9 October 2001, all movement of people and goods between Israel and the Palestinian territories was halted, and a complete internal closure came into effect on 14 November 2001.

The Intifada came to an end in February 2005, and Israel forces and settlers left the Gaza Strip by 1 September 2005 as part of Israel's unilateral disengagement plan. To improve the movement of people and economic activity in the Gaza Strip, Israel and the PA on 15 November 2005 signed an "Agreement on Movement and Access" (AMA). The AMA provided for the reopening of the Rafah crossing with Egypt, which was to be monitored by the PA and the European Union. Only people with Palestinian identity cards or foreign nationals, subject to Israeli oversight, were to be permitted to cross. In mid-November 2005, Israel started allowing some workers and traders to enter Israel via the Erez crossing, if they had Israeli-issued permits; however, until 21 January 2006, the crossing was open on less than 50% of working days on average.

Palestinians were invariably banned from traveling between Gaza and the West Bank. Following the Israeli disengagement from Gaza in September 2005, Israel "[established] a domestic legal framework apparently aimed at sealing off Gaza from Israel and from the West Bank" Israel had previously agreed, as part of the Oslo Accords, to treat Gaza and the West Bank as a single territorial unit, a position upheld by the Israeli High Court. However, following the 2005 disengagement, Israel adopted the position that Gaza residents have "no vested right" to cross into the West Bank; and that although there is "a certain connection" between the Gaza Strip and the West Bank, it "does not give Gaza residents a right to enter [the West Bank]". Those Gaza residents who did not try to cross the territory of Israel proper, but instead traveled around it, using the "long and expensive" route via Egypt and Jordan to travel from Gaza to the West Bank, were still turned back by Israeli border personnel at the Allenby Bridge when attempting to enter the West Bank from Jordan. This policy was still in place as of 2014: Gaza residents, except in rare "humanitarian" cases, are not allowed to enter the West Bank - even if they do not travel via Israel proper but around it, trying to enter via the Allenby Bridge.

AMA stipulated the opening hours of crossings between Gaza and Israel and the number of trucks/truckloads to pass through them. It also stipulated that bus convoys, carrying Palestinians from Gaza to the West Bank and vice versa, would start on 15 December 2005; and truck convoys, carrying goods on the same route, would start on 15 January 2006. This agreement was not upheld, as neither bus nor truck convoys started by their respective dates. Israel first announced that according to its interpretation, Israel was only obliged to run a "test" or "pilot" bus route and only for Palestinians meeting certain Israeli-specified requirements, then delayed this pilot project "indefinitely". The part of the agreement concerning opening hours and throughput of border crossings was not implemented either.

The Palestinians claim that Israel did not honor AMA in relation to movement of people between Gaza and the West Bank. The bus convoys between Gaza and the West Bank (which were to start on 15 December 2005) never started.

Gazans are invariably banned from entering the West Bank, and Israel adopted the position that they have no legal right to do so. This position has not changed since 2005.

Naval blockade
 
The Israeli Navy enforces a maritime blockade of the Port of Gaza and the coastline.

Israeli officials said the restrictions were necessary because of past incidents of Palestinians using fishing boats for smuggling and attacks. Israeli patrol boats regularly patrol Gaza's coastline and fire on Palestinian fishing vessels that go beyond the permitted distance from shore.

Israel has intercepted a number of vessels attempting to bring supplies into Gaza, claiming that they may be providing goods that may be used to build arms. A humanitarian mission organised by the Free Gaza Movement, with Cynthia McKinney and Mairead Maguire on board, was intercepted by Israel attempting to sail to Gaza. They were deported but the supplies were later delivered to Gaza over land by truck.

On 29 April 2014, Gaza's Ark, a vessel being converted in Gaza from a fishing boat to carry cargo to Europe, was sunk by an explosion following a telephone warning to the guard, who was uninjured. The organisers of the project suspect that Israel forces are responsible.

Between 2000 and 2018, Al Mezan Center for Human Rights has documented 1,283 incidents involving Palestinian fishermen, including 1,192 shooting incidents that led to the death of 8 fishermen and to the injury of 134 fishermen. During these incidents, 656 fishermen were detained, and 209 boats were confiscated.

Effect on the fishing industry

The sea blockade has caused damage to Gaza fishing industry.

Shoals closer to shore have been depleted. The total catch pre-blockade in 1999 was nearly 4,000 tons, this was reduced to 2,700 tons in 2008. In the 90s, the Gaza fishing industry was worth $10 million annually or 4% of the total Palestinian economy; this was halved between 2001 and 2006. 45,000 Palestinians were employed in the fishing industry, employed in jobs such as catching fish, repairing nets and selling fish. Fish also provided much-needed animal protein to Gazans' diet.

The International Committee of the Red Cross also notes that "90% of Gaza's 4000 fishermen are now considered either poor (with a monthly income of between US$100 and US$190) or very poor (earning less than US$100 a month), up from 50% in 2008." Nezar Ayyash, head of Gaza's fishermen's union, is quoted as saying that he has been arrested and his boat confiscated several times. According to the Palestinian Fishermen's Syndicate, there are 3,800 registered fishermen in the Gaza Strip. Only 2,000 of them are currently working as a result of restrictions, constant attacks and growing cost of fishing equipment.

Energy restrictions

Almost all of Gaza's liquid fuel and about half of its electricity are supplied by Israel, while Gaza's sole power plant runs on crude diesel imported via Israel. In normal times, Israel exempts from the blockade fuel for the power plant as well as for essential services such as hospitals, and does not cut electricity supplies. However, during times of conflict, Israel has disrupted supplies. In late October 2007, in response to persistent rocket fire on southern Israel, Israel cut diesel exports to Gaza by 15% and gasoline exports by 10%, and created targeted electrical outages for 15 minutes after a rocket attack. According to Israeli officials, the energy flow to hospitals and Israeli shipments of crude diesel to Gaza's sole power plant was unaffected. The Israeli government argued that these limited energy cuts were a non-violent way to protest against Hamas rocket attacks.

The following day, Attorney General of Israel Menachem Mazuz suspended the electricity cuts, and the Israeli Supreme Court gave the government three days to justify its energy cuts policy.

On 1 December 2007, the Israeli Supreme Court ruled that the electricity cuts were unlawful, and ordered the Israeli military to stop them by the following day. In its ruling, however, the court allowed Israel to continue reducing its diesel and gasoline shipments to Gaza.

Control of Gazan air space
The Oslo Accords interim peace agreements expressly give Israel security control over Gazan airspace and coastal waters. Gazan air space is controlled by radar. Unmanned aerial surveillance drones regularly patrol, there are regular overflights by Israeli fighter jets and a surveillance balloon is tethered near the Erez crossing.

Limitation of basic goods

Israel allows limited humanitarian supplies from aid organizations into the Gaza Strip, but not dual-use items, which can also be used for military purposes. According to the Coordinator of Government Activities in the Territories of the Israel Defense Forces, in May 2010, this included over 1.5 million litres of diesel fuel and gasoline, fruits and vegetables, wheat, sugar, meat, chicken and fish products, dairy products, animal feed, hygiene products, clothing and shoes.

According to Gisha, items that have at various times been denied importation into Gaza in 2010 include ordinary consumer goods such as jam, candles, books, musical instruments, shampoo, A4 paper, and livestock such as chicken, donkeys, and cows. The UN Office for the Coordination of Humanitarian Affairs also lists wheelchairs, dry food items, crayons, stationery, and soccer balls as shipments that Israeli authorities have prevented from entering Gaza. International aid group Mercy Corps said it was blocked from sending 90 tons of macaroni and other foodstuffs. After international pressure, Israeli authorities said that they were giving the shipment a green light. Israel was also reported to have prevented aid groups from sending in other items, such as paper, art supplies, tomato paste and lentils. Because of an Israeli ban on the importation of construction materials such as cement and steel, which could be used to build bunkers for military use by Hamas, the UN Relief and Works Agency started to build mud brick homes. Aid agencies say that food waits on trucks and in warehouses, and many basic items are rejected by Israel as "luxuries" or are turned down for unexplained reasons. "Tin" cans are banned because the steel from which they are made might be used to build weaponry or structures by Hamas, making it hard for Gazan farmers to preserve their vegetables. At one time the only fruit allowed was bananas, allegedly because the Israeli official owned a banana plantation.

Limitation system
In September 2007, the Israeli cabinet voted to tighten the restrictions on the Gaza strip.  The cabinet decision stated, "the movement of goods into the Gaza Strip will be restricted; the supply of gas and electricity will be reduced; and restrictions will be imposed on the movement of people from the Strip and to it."

In January 2010, the Israeli group Gisha took Israeli authorities to court, forcing them to reveal which goods were permitted and which goods weren't. The Israeli government replied that canned fruit, fruit juices and chocolate are blocked, while at the same time canned meat, canned tuna, mineral water, sesame paste, tea and coffee are allowed into the Gaza Strip. Banned items also included coriander, shampoo and shoes.

In October 2010, papers were released which revealed a system to maintain the minimum level of basic goods entering the Strip. It contained upper and lower warning lines, identifying surpluses and shortages of listed products in Gaza.

In October 2012, an Israeli court forced Israel's Coordinator of Government Activities in the Territories (COGAT) to release a document that detailed "red lines" for "food consumption in the Gaza strip" during the 2007 blockade.  According to the COGAT, the document was a rough draft, and never actually implemented.  He want on further to say that there was never even any discussion after the document had been drafted.  The document calculates the minimum number of calories necessary to keep Gazans from malnutrition and avoid a humanitarian crisis.  This number was converted to a number of daily truckloads, the number being decreased to account for food produced in Gaza, and further on the basis of "culture and experience" of the Gazans.  This reduction, if implemented, would have resulted in an increase in sugar and a decrease in fruits, vegetables, milk, and meat. Gisha, an Israeli human-rights group, said that in fact the number of truckloads allowed into Gaza was less than stipulated in the calculation.  The UN said that if the policy was intended to cap food imports, it would go against humanitarian principles.  The body responsible for the calculation said its intent was to ensure no shortages occur, not to cap food imports. Israeli officials now acknowledge the restrictions were partly meant to pressure Hamas by making the lives of Gazans difficult.

Israel limits the amount of load the trucks may carry, ostensibly for security reasons. In the past, the total height of goods stacked on trucks was not allowed to exceed 1.2 meters. The Israeli authorities did, however, not explain why they did not use to its full potential the scanner, donated by the Dutch government and calibrated according to the military's specifications, which can scan at a height of 2 meters. In February 2016, the allowed height was increased to 1.5 meters.

Blockade timeline 2007-2010

June 2007 – January 2008
In June 2007, Hamas took control of the Gaza Strip in the Battle of Gaza, and removed Fatah officials. Following the Hamas takeover, the sanctions put in place after Hamas's 2006 electoral victory were dramatically tightened. Truck transits, which had been 12,000 per month in 2005, were reduced to 2,000 by November of that year, when in a further measure, in the context of Hamas rocket fire and Israeli attacks, food supplies were halved, fuel imports slashed and foreign currency restricted by the latter.

Following the Hamas takeover in Gaza, Egypt and Israel largely sealed their border crossings with Gaza, on the grounds that Fatah had fled and the PA was no longer providing security on the Palestinian side.

In July 2007, Israeli officials stated they had been planning to open the Rafah border crossing to allow stranded Palestinians to return, but claimed that this plan had been cancelled after Hamas threatened to fire on the refugees.

A Jerusalem Post article mentioned Hamas' complaints that since June 2008 the PA no longer granted passports to Gazans, thereby "preventing tens of thousands of Palestinians from being able to travel abroad".

Egypt, fearing a spill-over of Hamas-style militancy into its territory, kept its border with Gaza largely sealed. Israel sealed the border completely on 17 January in response to rocket attacks on southern Israel and Palestinian militant attacks on crossing points between Israel and Gaza.

The Egyptian government feared also that Iran wanted to establish a base in its territory as well as in Gaza through its proxy Hezbollah following the 2009 Hezbollah plot in Egypt.

January 2008 breach of the Gaza-Egypt border

On 22 January 2008, Gazans clashed with Egyptian police in front of the border, demanding that the Rafah Border Crossing be opened. The clashes included live fire, and there were injuries on both sides. Fifty women managed to cross, and Egyptian police responded with a water cannon assault. Additional Egyptian security forces arrived, and managed to restore calm and prevent further crossing.

The breach of the Gaza-Egypt border began on 23 January 2008, after gunmen in the Gaza Strip set off an explosion near the Rafah Border Crossing, destroying part of the former Israeli Gaza Strip barrier. The United Nations estimated that as many as half of the population of the Gaza Strip crossed the border into Egypt seeking food and supplies. Israel said that militants had exploited the breach in the border wall to send armed men into the Sinai to infiltrate Israel across the Sinai-Israel border. Egyptian troops at first permitted the crossing but did not allow Palestinians to travel further than El Arish. On 25 January, Egyptian forces blocked almost all illegal entry points to stem the flow of Gazans pouring in, and Egyptian riot police erected barbed wire and chain-link fences along the border. Palestinians used a bulldozer to knock down the fence and once again flooded in. Egyptian border police began stopping Palestinians from crossing and sealed the road from Rafah to El Arish. On 28 January, Egyptian security forces and Hamas militants strung barbed wire across one of the breaches, sealing it off. The Egyptians began repairing one of the two remaining breaches on 29 January, and closed the border with the Gaza Strip on 3 February 2008.

Mid-2008 violence
Throughout mid-2008, Israel continued to inspect all humanitarian aid for Gaza and delivering approved items through the Karni, Kerem Shalom, Erez, and Sufa crossing points.

Throughout this period, Hamas launched raids against these crossing points. The first was a 9 April infiltration by four Hamas fighters through the Kerem Shalom border crossing. The four fighters attacked a terminal in Nahal Oz being used to deliver fuel to Gaza, killing two workers. Three of the fighters were subsequently killed by Israeli strikes as they attempted to flee.

On 19 April, Hamas launched another attack against a border crossing in the early morning hours. Three fighters were killed in the operation, and thirteen Israeli soldiers were wounded.

June 2008 attempt at easing restrictions
Under a ceasefire agreement between Israel and Hamas in June 2008, Israel agreed to lift its blockade of Gaza Strip. At Egypt's request, Israel did not always respond to Palestinian ceasefire violations by closing the border.

Israel accused Hamas of transporting weapons into Gaza via tunnels to Egypt, failing to stop rocket attacks, and noted that Hamas would not continue negotiating the release of Israeli hostage Gilad Shalit, who had been held by Hamas since 2006. Hamas' decision alienated it from the government of Egypt, which had linked the opening of the Gaza-Egypt border crossing to Shalit's release. In the early stage of the ceasefire, Israeli officials had stated that they found "a certain sense of progress" on Shalit's release.

The UN recorded seven Israel Defense Forces (IDF) violations of the ceasefire between 20 and 26 June, and three violations by Palestinian groups not affiliated with Hamas between 23 and 26 June. On 18 December, the Izz ad-Din al-Qassam Brigades, the military wing of Hamas, reported 185 Israeli violations during the lull period. The Intelligence and Terrorism Information Center reported a total of 223 rockets and 139 mortar shells fired from Gaza during the lull, including 20 rockets and 18 mortar shells before 4 November. It noted that "Hamas was careful to maintain the ceasefire" until 4 November, when the ceasefire was "seriously eroded." Rocket fire decreased by 98 percent in the four-and-a-half months between 18 June and 4 November, compared to the four-and-a-half-months preceding the ceasefire. Hamas denied responsibility for the rocket fire during the lull. Human Rights Watch reported that Hamas security forces demonstrated an ability to curb rocket fire while some people detained for rocket fire were released without explanation.

In August 2008, the first NGO-organized attempts to breach Israel's maritime closure of the Gaza Strip occurred when two vessels, containing activists from the Free Gaza Movement and International Solidarity Movement, sailed from Cyprus towards Gaza, carrying hearing aids and balloons. The boats reached Gaza on 23 August 2008 after the Israeli government allowed the boats free passage. Four more voyages occurred from October until December 2008, as passengers were transported another boat called the "Dignity", a 66-foot yacht owned by the Free Gaza Movement. The Dignity was rammed three times while it was sailing in international waters by the Israeli Navy and significant damage was incurred.

On 28 October 2008, the Dignity, carrying 26 activists and medical supplies, docked in a strip harbor without interference. Israel had initially decided to stop the vessel, but the decision was made to let it through just before it reached Gaza. The Dignity sailed to Gaza four times before it was attacked on 30 December 2008 in international waters, as it sailed towards Gaza to deliver medicine and medical help.

In August 2008, it was reported that Israel despite the ceasefire was still allowing in very few goods. A WikiLeaks cable from the US embassy in Tel Aviv dated 3 November 2008 revealed that Israel still maintained the economy of the Gaza strip "on the brink of collapse" without "pushing it over the edge,". The cable said that "Israeli officials have confirmed to Embassy officials on multiple occasions that they intend to keep the Gazan economy functioning at the lowest level possible consistent with avoiding a humanitarian crisis."

2008–2009 Gaza war and aftermath

In January 2009, after the first phase of the Gaza War, Israel said it would allow in some humanitarian aid, but will continue its economic blockade in order to weaken the power of Hamas. In June 2009, on the second anniversary of the blockade, 38 United Nations and non-governmental humanitarian organisations issued a joint press release calling for "free and uninhibited access for all humanitarian assistance in accordance with the international agreements and in accordance with universally recognised international human rights and humanitarian law standards". As of July 2009, Israel said it is making the humanitarian relief efforts in Gaza one of its top priorities. The amount of goods Israel allows into Gaza is one quarter of the pre- blockade flow.

Mark Regev, spokesman for Israeli Prime Minister Ehud Olmert stated "We want to make sure that reconstruction for the people of Gaza is not reconstruction for the Hamas regime." U.S. State Department spokesman Robert Wood said on 25 February that "Aid should never be used as a political weapon. We'll try to push to get into Gaza as many supplies as possible."

The Olmert cabinet had decided in March 2009 that food and medical supplies to Gaza would be allowed through unfettered. This was met with resistance by Israel's Defense Ministry, which controls the border crossings. An Israeli military spokesperson said that each item was decided on an individual basis and that food was being let through daily. According to NGO Gisha, the amount of food entering Gaza is as of May 2009, about 25% of the pre-June 2007 figures. A UN study has found that Gazan families are eating fewer meals a day and mainly relying on carbohydrates such as rice and flour because protein foods are expensive or unavailable. Chicken eggs have doubled in price due to the destruction of chicken coops during the Gaza War.

February 2009 Hamas-UNRWA incident
On 3 February, 3,500 blankets and over 400 food parcels were confiscated by Hamas police personnel from an UNRWA distribution center. On the following day, the UN Emergency Relief Coordinator demanded that the aid be returned immediately. In a separate incident on 5 February, Hamas seized 200 tons of food from UNRWA aid supplies. The following day, UNRWA suspended its activities in Gaza. Hamas issued a statement stating that the incident was a misunderstanding between the drivers of the trucks and had been resolved through direct contact with the UNRWA. On 9 February, UNRWA lifted the suspension on the movement of its humanitarian supplies into Gaza, after the Hamas authorities returned all of the aid supplies confiscated.

June 2009 easing of blockade
In June 2009, the blockade was eased to allow processed hummus, but not hummus with extras such as pine nuts or mushrooms.

May 2010 Gaza flotilla raid

On 31 May 2010 the Israeli Navy seized an aid convoy of six ships known as the "Gaza Freedom Flotilla". aiming to break through the blockade, carrying humanitarian aid and construction materials. The flotilla had declined an Israeli request to change course to the port of Ashdod, where the Israeli government had said it would inspect the aid and deliver (or let humanitarian organizations deliver) Israeli-approved items to Gaza.

Israeli Shayetet 13 naval commandos boarded the ships from speedboats and helicopters launched from three missile ships, while the flotilla was still in international waters. On the MV Mavi Marmara, the main ship of the convoy, passengers attacked and managed to capture three soldiers. Israeli soldiers responded with rubber bullets and live ammunition from soldiers in helicopters and on the ship. Israel was accused of using disproportionate force with a number of people shot from behind. On other ships, soldiers were met with passive resistance which was easily suppressed with non-lethal techniques. Nine passengers were killed and dozens wounded. Nine soldiers were also injured, two of them seriously. All of the ships were seized and towed to Ashdod, while passengers were imprisoned in Israel and then deported to their home countries. The MV Rachel Corrie, a seventh ship that had been delayed, set sail from Malta on the same day of the flotilla's interception. Israeli naval vessels shadowed the Rachel Corrie, and after it ignored three warnings, Israeli commandos boarded the ship from speedboats, arrested the crew, and forced it to sail to Ashdod.

Freedom Flotilla II

Following the Gaza flotilla raid, a coalition of 22 NGOs assembled in July 2011 a flotilla of 10 vessels and 1,000 activists to breach the blockade.

The vessels docked in Greece in preparation for the journey to Gaza. However, the Greek government announced that it would not allow the vessels to leave for Gaza, and the Hellenic Coast Guard stopped three vessels attempting to evade the travel ban and leave port. On 7 July, most activists left for home, leaving only a few dozen to continue the initiative. On 16 July, the French yacht Dignite Al Karama was allowed to leave port after informing Greek authorities that its destination was Alexandria, Egypt. Instead, the yacht headed directly for Gaza. The Israeli Navy stopped the Dignite Al Karama about 65 kilometers off Gaza. After the boat was warned and refused to turn back, it was surrounded by three Israeli naval vessels and boarded by Shayetet 13 commandos, who took it over. The boat was then taken to Ashdod. Ultimately, the Freedom Flotilla sailing did not take place.

Third Flotilla
On 4 November 2011, the Israeli Navy intercepted two vessels heading towards Gaza in a private initiative to break the blockade. Shayetet 13 commandos boarded the vessels from speedboats and took them over with no resistance. The vessels were then taken to Ashdod port.

June 2010 easing of the blockade
Facing mounting international calls to ease or lift their blockade in response to the Gaza flotilla raid, Egypt and Israel lessened the restrictions starting in June 2010. Israel announced that it will allow all strictly civilian goods into Gaza while preventing weapons and what it designates as "dual-use" items from entering Gaza. Egypt partly opened the Rafah border crossing from Egypt to Gaza, primarily for people, but not for supplies, to go through. The Israeli NGO Gisha Legal Center for Freedom of Movement reported in a July 2010 publication that Israel continues to prevent normal functioning of the Gazan economy. Israel continues to severely restrict and/or prevent people from entering or exiting Gaza according to Gisha. The United Nations Office for the Coordination of Humanitarian Affairs (UNOCHA) conducted an assessment of the humanitarian impact of the easing of the blockage in January and February 2011 and concluded that they did not result in a significant improvement in people's livelihoods. The World Bank estimated in 2015 that the GDP losses caused by the blockade since 2007 was above 50%, and entailed large welfare losses.

On 1 June 2010, the Rafah border crossing from Egypt to Gaza was partially opened. Egypt's foreign ministry has made it clear that the crossing will remain open mainly for people, not for aid, to go through. Several aid trucks began making it into Gaza during the following morning including some carrying power generators from the Egyptian Red Crescent, and hundreds of Gazans who had been staying in Egypt returned home, although little traffic, human or cargo, flowed from Gaza to Egypt. On 3 June, the manager of the Gaza side of the Rafah crossing, Salameh Barakeh, explained that the crossing is open for the free travel of patients, foreign passport holders, those with residency status in other countries, students and internationals. The Arab Physicians Union officials submitted a request to Egyptian authorities on 3 June 2010 to send 400 tons of food, blankets, electric generators for hospitals and construction material from Egypt to Gaza, but their request was denied by Egyptian authorities without specific reason. Emad Gad, political analyst at Egyptian Al-Ahram Center for Political and Strategic Studies, believes the government should keep the Rafah border under control because opening it completely could allow weapons smuggling or illegal financial transactions.

On 17 June 2010, Israel's Prime Minister's Office announced that Israel's security cabinet had agreed to relax Israel's blockade on the Gaza Strip, and issued an English-language press release, according to which a decision to ease the blockade had been made. The English text reads: "It was agreed to liberalize the system by which civilian goods enter Gaza [and] expand the inflow of materials for civilian projects that are under international supervision." However, no binding decision has been made during the cabinet meeting, and an announcement issued in Hebrew did not mention any such decision. The Prime Minister's office said that a meeting would be held soon, and expressed hope that a binding decision will be taken then.

On 20 June 2010, Israel's Security Cabinet approved a new system governing the blockade that would allow practically all non-military items to enter the Gaza strip. According to a cabinet statement, Israel would "expand the transfer of construction materials designated for projects that have been approved by the Palestinian Authority, including schools, health institutions, water, sanitation and more – as well as (projects) that are under international supervision." Despite the easing of the land blockade, Israel announced its intention to continue to inspect all goods bound for Gaza by sea at the port of Ashdod. Internationally, this decision received mixed reactions.

International Response to Easing of Restrictions
Tony Blair, who welcomed Israel's decision to ease the restrictions on behalf of the Quartet on the Middle East, said that the Quartet – the UN, US, EU, and Russia – would continue talks with Israel "to flesh out the principles". Suggesting that "items of ordinary daily life, including materials for the construction of homes, infrastructure and services as the UN have asked" should be allowed to enter Gaza, he stated that "the decision to allow foodstuffs and household items is a good start". A spokesperson for the Secretary-General of the United Nations declared that the Secretary-General would be encouraged that the Israeli government is reviewing its policy towards Gaza. He added that the United Nations would continue to seek a fundamental change in policy as agreed by the Quartet. Hamas spokesperson Sami Abu Zuhri said that Israel's decision would have been designed to "beautify" the blockade and mislead public opinion.

A British Foreign Office spokesman said: "It is good that Israel is giving serious consideration to resolving these issues, [b]ut further work is needed. We need to see the additional steps still to be announced." EU officials also said they were disappointed by the decision. German Minister of Economic Cooperation and Development Dirk Niebel said that the Israeli announcement was "not sufficient". During a visit to the country, Niebel intended to visit a sewage treatment plant being financed with German development aid, but was denied entry into the Gaza strip by Israel. He commented that the Israeli government sometimes would "not make it easy for its friends to explain why it behaves the way it does." A spokesperson for Israel's Foreign Ministry responded that Israel would have been obliged to allow any other European minister entry if it had allowed Niebel to visit the Gaza strip, thus conferring additional legitimacy to the Hamas government.

Chris Gunness from UNRWA criticised Israel's move to ease the blockade as not being adequate, saying that "Even if the blockade is eased it remains illegal under international law as it is a collective form of punishment on a civilian population. Eighty percent of Gaza's population is aid-dependent. Allowing more aid in is perpetuating this dependency and not addressing the issue of self- sufficiency or the root causes of the crisis. What have not been addressed by the easing of the closure are the issues of exports as well as the limited number of crossings open to facilitate the flow of goods. Operation Cast Lead destroyed at least 60,000 homes and structures which need to be urgently repaired and rebuilt. The easing of the blockade is not addressing this adequately."

Maxwell Gaylard, UN Deputy Special and Humanitarian Coordinator for the Middle East also criticised Israel, saying "Permitting mayonnaise and potato chips into Gaza is really irrelevant in dealing with the underlying issues. What we need to see is an improvement in Gaza's water, sanitation, power grid, educational and health sectors. Gaza's economy is shot to pieces and its infrastructure is extremely fragile."

New blockade policy by Israel
On 20 June 2010, Israel's Security Cabinet approved a new system governing the blockade that would allow practically all non-military or dual-use items to enter the Gaza strip. According to a cabinet statement, Israel would "expand the transfer of construction materials designated for projects that have been approved by the Palestinian Authority, including schools, health institutions, water, sanitation and more – as well as (projects) that are under international supervision." Despite the easing of the land blockade, Israel will continue to inspect all goods bound for Gaza by sea at the port of Ashdod.

Israeli Prime Minister Benjamin Netanyahu said that the decision enabled Israel to focus on real security issues and would eliminate "Hamas' main propaganda claim," and that it would strengthen the case for keeping the sea blockade in place. He also said the decision would have been coordinated with the United States and with Tony Blair, the representative of the Quartet for the Middle East. Blair characterized the decision as a "very significant step forward", but added that the decision needs to be implemented. In a statement, the Quartet said that the situation remained "unsustainable and unacceptable" and maintained that a long-term solution was urgently needed. The UNRWA called for a complete lift of the Gaza blockade, expressing concern that the new policy would continue to limit Gaza's ability to develop on its own. The European Union's representative for foreign policy, Catherine Ashton, welcomed the decision. She called the step "a significant improvement" and expressed the expectation that the measures take effect as soon as possible, adding that "more work remains to be done." The U.S. government welcomed the decision, expressing the belief that the easing would significantly improve the lives of Gaza Strip residents and prevent weapons smuggling. It expressed its intention to contribute to an international effort to "explore additional ways to improve the situation in Gaza, including greater freedom of movement and commerce between Gaza and the West Bank." Hamas dismissed the measures as trivial and "media propaganda", and demanded a complete lifting of the blockade, including the removal on all restrictions on the import of construction material. Israeli Arab member of Knesset Hanin Zoabi commented that the easing of the blockade would prove that "it is not a security blockade, but a political one," adding that the flotilla "succeeded in undermining the blockade's legitimacy."

The U.S., United Nations, European Union and Russia in 2010 were jointly consulting with Israel, the Palestinian Authority and Egypt on additional measures, described by the United States Department of State as a "fundamental change in policy" toward the Gaza strip.

Lieberman Proposal
In July 2010, Israel's foreign minister Avigdor Lieberman proposed an initiative to shift full responsibility over the Gaza Strip to the international community. He announced that he plans to discuss the idea, which was labeled a "personal initiative" with the EU Foreign Minister Catherine Ashton.

Lieberman proposed that units of the French Foreign Legion and commando units from EU member states be sent in to secure the Gaza border crossings to prevent the smuggling of weapons, and that the border with Israel be sealed. Ships that underwent inspections in Cyprus or Greece would be allowed to dock in Gaza and unload humanitarian cargoes. The EU would help improve and build civilian infrastructure, and Gaza would become a fully independent entity.

Humanitarian impact assessment
In January and February 2011, the United Nations Office for the Coordination of Humanitarian Affairs (UNOCHA) conducted an assessment of the effects of the measures to ease the access restrictions. They concluded that they did not result in a significant improvement in people's livelihoods.

They found that a limited reactivation of the private sector resulted from the increased availability of consumer goods and some raw materials but the "pivotal nature of the remaining restrictions" and the effects of three years of strict blockade prevented a significant improvement in livelihoods. Although the unemployment rate in Gaza fell from 39.3% to 37.4% in the second half of 2010 there were significant food price rises. There was little or no improvement in food insecurity rates in Gaza which continued to affect 52% of the population. Few of the 40,000 housing units needed to replace homes lost during Operation Cast Lead and for natural population growth could be built as a result of the ongoing restrictions on importing building materials. The approval of over 100 projects funded by international organizations intended to improve the "extremely deteriorated" water and sanitation, education and health services, followed the easing of the blockade. The implementation of these projects was delayed by the entry approval process for materials and the limited opening of the Karni crossing. OCHA found that there had been no improvement in the quality of services provided to the population of the Gaza Strip as a result of the projects so far. There was no significant increase in the number of exit permits granted by Israel to allow access to the outside world including other parts of the Palestinian territories. Permits continued to be issued by Israel only on an exceptional basis with 106-114 per day being issued during the second half of 2010. OCHA described Egypt's move to regularly operate its crossing with Gaza for special categories of people as a "significant, albeit limited, improvement".

They concluded that the easing of restrictions was "a step in the right direction" but called on Israel to fully abolish the blockade including removing restrictions on the import of construction materials and the exports of goods, and to lift the general ban on the movement of people between Gaza and the West Bank via Israel in order to comply with what they described as international humanitarian and human rights law obligations.

According to the World Health Organization, the shortage of essential medicines and equipment has been the primary obstacle to providing adequate health care in the Gaza Strip since the 2012 conflict.  Gazan hospitals had a shortage of more than 50% of "medical consumables" even before the conflict.  Workers in some hospitals reported having to sterilize and re-use single-use equipment due to the lack of critical items.  Palestinian hospitals are unable to meet the need of their patients due to economic underdevelopment and the varying strictness of the Israeli blockade. According to B'Tselem,Restrictions on Movement the blockade, which not only restricts Gazans' access to Israel but also communication between Gaza and the West Bank, has denied Gazan fishermen access to 85% of the waters they have been guaranteed access to.

During the 2014 Israel-Gaza Conflict, 108,000 people were displaced, almost all of whom are still living in UNWRA refugee camps or inadequate improvised shelters.  28 schools, numerous wells, and other important civil infrastructure like major sewage and electricity plants were destroyed during Operation Protective Edge. Since then over 2,000 truckloads of materials for reconstruction have been allowed into Gaza, but according to a UN estimate, 735 truckloads per day, for three years, would be necessary to rebuild all the damaged infrastructure.

Further easing (2011–2013) 

Following the Egyptian Revolution of 2011, Egypt for some time opened the Rafah border crossing permanently as of 28 May 2011. A limited number of women of all ages and men aged below 18 and above 40 were able to enter Egypt without a visa, although there are still severe restrictions on the movement of personnel and goods to and from Gaza. In 2012 Egypt started supplying fuel to the Gaza Strip, to help ease a lengthy fuel crisis arising from a dispute between Egypt and the Hamas government in Gaza over whether Gaza can trade with Egypt openly, or only via Israel.

In 2013 Israel has eased its regulation on the entering of construction material into Gaza. The regulation was an attempt to reduce rocket fire in the south.

Prior to a Gaza visit, scheduled for April 2013, Turkey's Prime Minister Recep Tayyip Erdogan explained to Turkish newspaper Hürriyet that the fulfilment of three conditions by Israel was necessary for friendly relations to resume between Turkey and Israel: an apology for the raid (Prime Minister Netanyahu had delivered an apology to Erdogan by telephone on 22 March 2013), the awarding of compensation to the families affected by the raid, and the lifting of the Gaza blockade by Israel. The Turkish prime minister also explained in the Hürriyet interview, in relation to the April 2013 Gaza visit, "We will monitor the situation to see if the promises are kept or not." At the same time, Netanyahu affirmed that Israel would only consider exploring the removal of the Gaza blockade if peace ("quiet") is achieved in the area.

Land blockade
The Muslim Brotherhood in the Egyptian parliament wished to open trade across the border with Gaza in 2012, a move said to be resisted by Egypt's Tantawi government.

Goods blocked
According to the "Failing Gaza", Amnesty International and other organizations reported that cement, glass, steel, bitumen, wood, paint, doors, plastic pipes, metal pipes, metal reinforcement rods, aggregate, generators, high voltage cables and wooden telegraph poles were "high priority reconstruction materials currently with no or highly limited entry into Gaza through official crossings." A 2009 UN report by Kevin M. Cahill called the restrictions "Draconian", and said that reconstruction efforts were being undermined by Israel's refusal to permit the importation of steel, cement or glass, among other building materials, and its policy of restricted importation of lentils, pasta, tomato paste and juice, as well as batteries for hearing aids for deaf children. He said that despite the restrictions, UNRWA had been able to provide a basic food supply to over a million refugees in the Gaza Strip. He added that he "visited a food station where hundreds of displaced persons waited to collect their meager staples of rice, sugar, lentils and cooking oil. While this program may save people from starvation, it is a diet that does not prevent the highest level of anemia in the region, with alarming rates of childhood stunting due to inadequate nutrition."

The Palestinians who negotiated the 2008 cease-fire believed that commerce in Gaza was to be restored to the levels preceding Israel's 2005 withdrawal and Hamas's electoral victory. Israeli policy tied the easing of the blockade to success in reducing rocket fire. Israel permitted a 20% increase in goods trucked into Gaza in the pre-lull period, up from 70 to 90 truckloads a day, including not only humanitarian supplies but also clothes, shoes, refrigerators, and construction materials. Fuel supplies increased from 55MW worth to 65MW worth. BBC News reported on 11 November that Gaza was then receiving only 28% of the amount of goods traded before the Hamas takeover.

Over the one-month period from 4 November to 8 December, approximately 700 truck loads of goods went into Gaza, accounting for approximately 1/40th of estimated pre-blockade commerce.

Israel stated that food imports into the Strip were limited by its inability to operate at border checkpoints. It accused Hamas of exacerbating fuel shortages by leading labor union strikes by power plant workers. It has also accused Hamas of underfunding the Gaza health care system, and then blaming the situation on Israel despite supposed free trade of medical supplies. Shipments of permitted medical supplies have expired due to the lengthy process required for passage through border crossings, requiring their destruction. Israel states that travel restrictions on Gazans is necessary to protect national security, citing the cases of three Gazans who claimed to require medical attention in Israel but who were in fact planning attacks in Israel.

Tunnels

The Gaza smuggling tunnels are mainly located at Rafah, on the border with Egypt. The tunnels connect the Egyptian town of Rafah with the Palestinian refugee camp of Rafah. As a result of the blockade, these tunnels became a vital supply artery for Gaza. They are used for various purposes, such to transport people (in and out) and commercial materials like medicine, food and clothes, cigarettes, alcohol, and vehicle parts into Gaza. They are also used to smuggle illegal arms (including rockets, mortars and explosives) to Gaza militants. Often cars are sliced into four parts and transported across and re-assembled in Gaza. Ahead of the Islamic festival, Eid al-Adha, they were used to transport live cattle.

According to a tunnel operator, Israel bombards tunnels from the air, while Egypt either pumps poisonous gases and water or detonates explosives to destroy tunnels. During the Gaza War, Israel destroyed most of the tunnels, reducing their number to 150 (from 3,000) as of late 2009. Egypt is constructing an underground steel barrier to prevent circumvention of the blockade through tunnels.

The UN estimates unemployment has risen from 32.5% in September, to around 40%. In addition to people directly employed by tunnels, the shortage of materials has stopped the majority of construction projects in Gaza and left many jobless.

Following the 2013 Egyptian coup d'état, Egypt's military has destroyed most of the 1,200 tunnels used for smuggling food, weapons and other goods into Gaza. After the August 2013 Rabaa Massacre in Egypt, the border crossing was closed 'indefinitely'.

Buffer zone
In October 2014, days after an attack in which 33 Egyptian soldiers were killed, Egypt announced it may create a buffer zone between Palestinian Rafah and Egyptian Rafah, where most tunnels were believed to be. Initially, the width of the buffer zone was 500 meter but on 18 November 2014, Egypt said it would expand it to 1 km. On 29 December 2014, the buffer zone was extended again to 5 km.

Egyptian authorities began implementing phase two in the flattening of large swaths of Egyptian Rafah where over 2,000 families lived, and widened the buffer zone. According to Egyptian reports, the second phase involved destroying everything standing across an additional 500 meters from the border area, on top of the 500 meters already cleared several months earlier.

Effects of land blockade on Gaza
There have been several reports and studies analysing the effect of the blockade on Gaza.

In July 2008, an UNRWA report on the situation in Gaza stated that "the number of households in Gaza below the consumption poverty line continued to grow, reaching 51.8% in 2007 (from 50.7% in 2006)". In the same year, a Palestinian Bureau of Statistics study concluded that 80% of families in Gaza were living below the poverty line. 
A World Health Organization assessment conducted in 2009 claimed that the level of anemia in babies (9–12 months) was as high as 65%, while a Socio-economic and Food Security Survey Report stated that 61% of Gazans are food insecure and reliant on humanitarian aid. Of those that are food insecure, 65% are children under 18 years. Lastly, a European Network of Implementing Development Agencies (EUNIDA) report notes that, because of the security buffer zone imposed around Gaza as part of the blockade, as of June 2009, 46% of agricultural land was either inaccessible or out of production.

On 14 June 2010, the International Committee of the Red Cross noted that the increasing scarcity of items has led to rises in cost of goods while quality has fallen. There is also "an acute electricity crisis", where electricity supplies are "interrupted for seven hours a day on average". As a consequence, they note that public services, particularly health services, have suffered, posing "a serious risk to the treatment of patients". In addition, medical equipment is difficult to repair, and medical staff cannot leave to gain more training. Lastly, the ICRC note that sanitation is suffering, because construction projects lack the equipment needed, or the equipment is of poor quality. Only 60% of the population is connected to a sewerage collection system, with the rest polluting the Gaza aquifer. As a result, water is largely "unfit for consumption".

A 25 May 2010 United Nations Development Programme report stated that, as a result of the blockade, most of Gaza's manufacturing industry has closed, and unemployment stood at an estimated 40%, a decrease on previous years. The blockade has also prevented much needed construction, noting that almost "none of the 3,425 homes destroyed during Cast Lead have been reconstructed, displacing around 20,000 people". Less than 20% "of the value of the damages to educational facilities has been repaired", only "half of the damage to the power network has been repaired", "no repair has been made to the transport infrastructure", "a quarter of damaged farmland has been rehabilitated and only 40% of private businesses have been repaired".

An August 2012 report by UNRWA of the blockade's effects and general trends in Gaza forecasted that the region's population growth would outpace developments in economic infrastructure. In its press release, UN humanitarian coordinator Maxwell Gaylard said, "Gaza will have half a million more people by 2020 while its economy will grow only slowly. In consequence, the people of Gaza will have an even harder time getting enough drinking water and electricity, or sending their children to school."

A UN OCHA 2015 report stated that "longstanding access restrictions imposed by Israel have undermined Gaza's economy, resulting in high levels of unemployment, food insecurity and aid dependency," and that "Israeli restrictions on the import of basic construction materials and equipment have significantly deteriorated the quality of basic services, and impede the reconstruction and repair of homes."

Economic effects
Following the implementation of the blockade, Israel halted all exports from the Gaza Strip. Israeli human rights organization Gisha, the Legal Center for Freedom of Movement, obtained an Israeli government document which says "A country has the right to decide that it chooses not to engage in economic relations or to give economic assistance to the other party to the conflict, or that it wishes to operate using 'economic warfare'". Sari Bashi, the director of Gisha, said that this showed that Israel wasn't imposing its blockade for its stated reasons of a security measure to prevent weapons from entering Gaza, but rather as collective punishment for the Palestinian population of Gaza.

In November 2010, the Israeli government allowed Gaza to resume agricultural exports, while still banning industrial exports. Shortly afterward, Gazan farmers began exporting strawberries, peppers, carnations, and cherry tomatoes. The exports travel to Europe via Israel, and Israel then transfers the money to agricultural cooperatives, which in turn pay the Palestinian farmers. The exports were implemented with aid from the Netherlands, which was monitored by the Israeli defense establishment.

It is estimated that in November, less than 20,000 liters of fuel per week entered Gaza via the tunnels, compared to nearly 1 million liters per day until June 2013. The Gaza Power Plant (GPP), which until recently supplied 30 percent of the electricity available in Gaza, has been exclusively dependent on Egyptian diesel smuggled through the tunnels, since early 2011. On 1 November, after depleting its fuel reserves, the GPP was forced to shut down triggering power outages of up to 16 hours per day, up from 8–12 hours prior to that.

The World Bank estimated in 2015 that the GDP losses caused by the blockade since 2007 was above 50%, and entailed large welfare losses. Gaza's manufacturing sector, once significant, shrunk by as much as 60 percent in real terms, due to the wars in the past 20 years and the blockade. Gaza's exports virtually disappeared since the imposition of the 2007 blockade. It stated that "solutions have to be found to enable faster inflow of construction materials into Gaza", while taking into account "legitimate security concerns of neighboring countries."

Legal analyses
The blockade has been criticized by former UN Secretary-General Ban Ki-moon, the United Nations Human Rights Council (UNHRC) and other human rights organizations.

The International Committee of the Red Cross (ICRC) is the guardian of international humanitarian law, the law applicable in situations of armed conflict. This special role of the ICRC is now formally recognized in the Statutes of the International Red Cross and Red Crescent Movement, which have been adopted both by the components of the Movement and by the States party to the Geneva Conventions, that is, practically all the world's States. Article 5 of the Statutes states that the role of the ICRC is "to undertake the tasks incumbent upon it under the Geneva Conventions, to work for the faithful application of international humanitarian law applicable in armed conflicts and to take cognizance of any complaints based on alleged breaches of that law" (Article 5.2c), and also "to work for the understanding and dissemination of knowledge of international humanitarian law applicable in armed conflicts and to prepare any development thereof" (Article 5.2g). The ICRC termed Israel's blockade of Gaza "collective punishment" in violation of international humanitarian law. In 2010 it also called the blockade a violation of the Geneva Conventions and called for its lifting.

These views are supported by further legal analyses. A multi-referenced University of California, Hastings College of the Law analysis recorded: 

The Global International Humanitarian Law Centre of Diakonia pointed out that:

Reactions

Israel

Since 2005, Israel asserts that it ended its occupation of Gaza when it disengaged from the coastal strip in 2005. After Israel's unilateral disengagement plan from the Gaza strip, Israel no longer has troops stationed within Gaza. Israel has retained control over Gaza's airspace and coastline, and over its own border with the territory. Egypt has control of its border with Gaza. Israel and Egypt also control the flow of goods in and out.  Israel controls fuel imports to Gaza, and also controls the majority of electricity used in Gaza (approximately 60%), which it supplies from the Israeli electrical grid. There have been a series of attacks by Israeli ground forces such as the 2008–2009 Israel–Gaza conflict, as well as rocket attacks on Israel and cross-border attacks by Gazan militant groups against Israeli troops.

In September 2007, citing an intensification of Qassam rocket attacks, Israel restricted the transfer of electricity, fuel, and other supplies into Gaza. Israel stated that the purpose of the blockade was to pressure Hamas into ending the rocket attacks and to deprive them of the supplies necessary for the continuation of rocket attacks. Israel argues that it is not legally responsible for Gaza beyond whatever is necessary to avoid a humanitarian crisis.

A US Congressional Research Service report claimed 'While there are differing views in Israel concerning the Gaza blockade ... most Israelis equate security with survival and peace. Israel's leaders appear to believe that the blockade of the Gaza Strip [among other security and deterrence measures], have brought about a quiet. ... As of the date of the Gaza flotilla incident, no Israeli had been killed in a terrorist or in a cross-border rocket attack in more than a year. Therefore, the Israeli government is reluctant to abandon the blockade tactic ... from its perspective.'

Israeli Prime Minister Benjamin Netanyahu maintained that the blockade is necessary to prevent weapons from reaching Gaza. He said, "(I)t's our obligation—as well as our right in accordance to international law and to common sense—to prevent these weapons
from entering by air, sea, and land." Referring to the Gaza flotilla, he added, "Had the blockade been breached, this flotilla would have been followed by dozens, by hundreds of ships. The amount of weapons that can be transported aboard a ship is totally different from what we saw get through the tunnels." He argued that the consequences of Israel's failure to maintain the blockade would be "an Iranian port in Gaza, only a few dozen kilometers from Tel Aviv and Jerusalem."

An Israeli government document stated,  An Israeli government spokesman added in 2010 that the blockade is intended to bring about a political goal and that Israel "could not lift the embargo altogether as long as Hamas remains in control" of Gaza.

Speaking in 2006, Dov Weisglass, an advisor to Israeli Prime Minister Ehud Olmert, allegedly said that, "The idea is to put the Palestinians on a diet, but not to make them die of hunger." Although this quote is widely reported, the original quote appears to have been: "It's like an appointment with a dietician. The Palestinians will get a lot thinner, but won't die." Weisglass has denied this report.

According to US diplomatic cables obtained by the WikiLeaks organization, diplomats stationed in the US embassy in Tel Aviv were briefed by Israelis on the blockade of the Gaza Strip. One of the cables states that "as part of their overall embargo plan against Gaza, Israeli officials have confirmed (...) on multiple occasions that they intend to keep the Gazan economy on the brink of collapse without quite pushing it over the edge".

Egypt

Egypt's argument is that it cannot open Rafah crossing unless the Palestinian Authority headed by Mahmoud Abbas controls the crossing and international monitors are present. Egypt Foreign Minister Ahmed Aboul Gheit said Hamas wants the border opened because it would represent Egyptian recognition of the group's control of Gaza. "Of course this is something we cannot do," he said, "because it would undermine the legitimacy of the Palestinian Authority and consecrate the split between Gaza and the West Bank."

According to Sharif Elmusa, Associate Professor of Political Science at the American University in Cairo, Israel wants Gaza to fade into Egypt. Egyptian authorities are determined to avoid opening the Rafah crossing without ending the Israeli siege, which would ultimately serve Israel's goal of displacing the Gaza problem onto Egypt. Secondly it is Cairo's concern that under Hamas rule violence can spill into Sinai and threaten tourism, leaving Egypt vulnerable to US and Israeli accusations of ineffectively fighting terrorism.

Following the events of the Gaza flotilla raid in May 2010, after Egypt opened its borders with Gaza, it was reported that former Egyptian President Hosni Mubarak was caught between the need to appease growing public anger at Israel's actions and the necessity of maintaining his close relationship with Israel. This friendship was needed to secure more than $2bn of American aid annually, money on which many analysts believe Mubarak's former regime depended.

While Israel contends that the blockade is necessary to prevent smuggling of weapons into Gaza, Egypt argues that it is needed to prevent smuggling of them from Gaza into the Sinai.

In the 2014 Israel-Gaza conflict, Israel claimed that over 30 underground attack tunnels were discovered under the Israel-Gaza Border which are used by militants in order to infiltrate Israel. It also claimed that over 600,000 tons of cement required to construct the tunnels was originally designated for humanitarian aid and diverted.

United States

Although the United States officially supports the blockade, Secretary of State Hillary Clinton met Israeli Minister of Defence Ehud Barak in February 2010 and urged him to ease the blockade. The United States has long been pressing Israel to ease the restrictions on Gaza. Speaking about the Gaza flotilla raid, which occurred on 31 May 2010, Clinton stated that "The situation in Gaza is unsustainable and unacceptable." In regards to the impending second Gaza flotilla, Clinton has stated that, "the Gaza flotilla is not necessary or useful." In June 2010 Secretary of State Hillary Clinton said the humanitarian needs in the Hamas-controlled area must be met along with legitimate Israeli security concerns.

The United Nations

On 24 January 2008, the United Nations Human Rights Council released a statement calling for Israel to lift its siege on the Gaza Strip, allow the continued supply of food, fuel, and medicine, and reopen border crossings. According to The Jerusalem Post, this was the 15th time in less than two years the council condemned Israel for its human rights record regarding the Palestinian territories. The proceedings were boycotted by Israel and the United States. Prior to this, U.N. Undersecretary-General for Humanitarian Affairs, John Holmes, described the blockade as "collective punishment", saying, "We all understand the security problems and the need to respond to that but collective punishment of the people of Gaza is not, we believe, the appropriate way to do that."

On 15 December 2008, following a statement in which he described the embargo on Gaza as a crime against humanity, United Nations Special Rapporteur Richard A. Falk was prevented from entering the Palestinian territories by Israeli authorities and expelled from the region. The Israeli Ambassador to the United Nations Itzhak Levanon said that the mandate of the Special Rapporteur was "hopelessly unbalanced," "redundant at best and malicious at worst."

In August 2009, U.N. human rights chief Navi Pillay criticised Israel for the blockade in a 34-page report, calling it a violation of the rules of war.

In March 2010, United Nations Secretary-General Ban Ki-Moon stated that the blockade of Gaza is causing "unacceptable suffering" and that families were living in "unacceptable, unsustainable conditions".

A UN Fact Finding mission in September 2009 led by South African Judge Richard Goldstone (the Goldstone report) concluded that the blockade was possibly a crime against humanity, and recommended that the matter be referred to the International Criminal Court if the situation has not improved in six months.

In May 2010, the UN Office for the Coordination of Humanitarian Affairs stated that the formal economy in Gaza has collapsed since the imposition of the blockade. They also stated that the "restrictions imposed on the civilian population by the continuing blockade of the Gaza Strip amount to collective punishment, a violation of international humanitarian law."

In June 2010, United Nations envoy to the Middle East and former UK Prime Minister Tony Blair stated that "The policy of Gaza is counter-productive and what [Israel] should be doing is allow material in to rebuild homes and sanitation and power and water systems and allow business to flourish. Nor do we in fact do damage to the position of Hamas by harming people in Gaza. People are harmed when the quality of service is poor and people cannot work." He also called for Hamas to stop the "terrorism coming out of Gaza". In the same month, Robert Serry, the UN special envoy for Middle East peace process, also said that "The flotilla crisis is the latest symptom of a failed policy. The situation in Gaza is unsustainable and the current policy is unacceptable and counter-productive, and requires a different, more positive strategy. The closure and blockade of the Gaza Strip needs to come to an end. There is now a welcome international consensus on Gaza."

In the September 2011 Palmer Report, the UN investigative committee for the 2010 Flotilla to Gaza said that Israel's naval blockade of Gaza was legal under international law, but criticised the nature of the Israeli raid. Later that same month, five independent U.N. rights experts reporting to the U.N. Human Rights Council rejected that conclusion, saying the blockade had subjected Palestinians in Gaza to collective punishment in "flagrant contravention of international human rights and humanitarian law."

European Union

In May 2011, EU Commissioner for Humanitarian Aid Kristalina Georgieva said the European Union and the United Nations were "calling for the immediate, sustained and unconditional opening of crossings for the flow of humanitarian aid, commercial goods and persons.", after she and UN Under Secretary-General for Humanitarian Affairs and Emergency Relief Valerie Amos had a meeting in Tel Aviv with Israeli Defence Minister Ehud Barak. She then said in an interview with Israel's Ynet that she believes that the "humanitarian crisis...was artificially created because of the blockade," but added that the idea of a flotilla is not the correct action to take: "We are not in favor of attempts to help people in this way."

Turkey

Turkish Prime Minister Recep Tayyip Erdoğan made harsh comments against the blockade, especially following the Gaza flotilla raid. Erdoğan raised the possibility of trying to forcibly breach the blockade by sending the Turkish Navy to escort any future flotilla or by trying to visit Gaza himself. The Turkish government made it clear that it opposes the blockade and regards it as illegal, and before the flotilla raid, issued a demand for safe passage. However, Turkish Foreign Minister Ahmet Davutoğlu said that Turkey was willing to normalize relations with Israel if it lifted the blockade. Following Israel's easing of the blockade, the Turkish Foreign Ministry called it "a positive but insufficient step", and said that "Turkey considers that Israel's inhuman blockade of Gaza represents a threat to regional peace and stability and considers that the blockade must be entirely lifted.

Ireland

After visiting Gaza in March 2010, Irish foreign minister Micheál Martin described the Israeli blockade of Palestinian-ruled Gaza as "inhumane and unacceptable" and called on the European Union and other countries to increase pressure on Israel to lift the blockade. Martin was the first EU foreign minister to enter Gaza in over a year. He said that all that is being achieved through the blockade is to "enrich Hamas and marginalize even further the voices of moderation."

United Kingdom

David Cameron, the UK Prime Minister, during Prime Minister's Questions, stated that "Friends of Israel – and I count myself a friend of Israel – should be saying to the Israelis that the blockade actually strengthens Hamas's grip on the economy and on Gaza, and it's in their own interests to lift it and allow these vital supplies to get through. ... We should do everything we can through the UN, where resolution 1860 is absolutely clear about the need to end the blockade and to open up Gaza." In July 2010, Cameron called on Israel to relax the blockade. He said "Humanitarian goods and people must flow in both directions. Gaza cannot and must not be allowed to remain a prison camp." In response, Ephraim Sneh, former Israeli minister, said: "Cameron is right – Gaza is a prison camp, but those who control the prison are Hamas. I'm totally against the double standards of a nation which fights the Taliban but is showing its solidarity with their brothers, Hamas.

Nick Clegg, the Deputy Prime Minister of the United Kingdom speaking after the Gaza flotilla raid, criticized the blockade saying "So the events of the last 24/48 hours confirm in my mind, as they do if you hear what William Hague and David Cameron have done and everyone in Government, the view that the blockade on Gaza is neither sustainable nor tenable in its present form." He also commented that "If we needed any confirmation about the unjustified and untenable blockade of Gaza, we have been reminded overnight of the need to lift this blockade. What is going on in Gaza is a humanitarian catastrophe. While of course Israel has every right to defend itself and its citizens from attack, we must now move towards lifting the blockade from Gaza as soon as possible."

William Hague, the Foreign Secretary, said in a prepared speech to the House of Commons that the blockade of Gaza was "unacceptable and unsustainable", and that it was "the view of the British government, including the previous government, that restrictions on Gaza should be lifted – a view confirmed in United Nations security council resolution 1860 which called for sustained delivery of humanitarian aid and which called on states to alleviate the humanitarian and economic situation", and that "current Israeli restrictions are counterproductive for Israel's long term security".

Acting Labour Leader Harriet Harman also stated that "This blockade must end."

Humanitarian organizations
Human Rights Watch argues that Israel is still an occupying power and is responsible for Gaza under the 1949 Fourth Geneva Convention, which seeks to protect the civilian population.

Amnesty International said that "The blockade constitutes collective punishment under international law and must be lifted immediately," and that as the occupying power, Israel has a duty under international law to ensure the welfare of Gaza's inhabitants, including their rights to health, education, food and adequate housing.

On 7 March 2008, several international aid groups, including Amnesty International, CARE International UK, and Oxfam, issued a report saying that the humanitarian situation in the Gaza Strip was more acute than at any time since the beginning of the Israeli occupation in 1967. While critical of Palestinian militants firing rockets from Gaza into Israel, and acknowledging that "Israel has the right and obligation to protect its citizens", they said that as the "occupying power in Gaza" it also has a legal duty to ensure Gaza civilians have access to food, clean water, electricity and medical care. They urged Israel to lift the blockade, characterizing it as collective punishment against the 1.5 million residents of the territory.

According to the International Committee of the Red Cross, "The hardship faced by Gaza's 1.5 million people cannot be addressed by providing humanitarian aid. The only sustainable solution is to lift the closure." The ICRC has also referred to the blockade as "a collective punishment imposed in clear violation of Israel's obligations under international humanitarian law".

In May 2015, the Euro-Mediterranean Human Rights Monitor issued a report discussing the situation in Gaza 9 months after the 2014 Israel–Gaza conflict. The report touched on the continuity of Gaza blockade was on the cost of relief, recovery and reconstruction due to last summer's war which reached $4 billion, as international donors pledged $3.5 billion for Gaza's reconstruction, only $954 million had been disbursed as of early April. The report also shed light on the UNRWA financial crises that threatened the stability of its operation in Gaza which probably further affect the humanitarian situation in Gaza Strip. The report accused the Egyptian authorities in joining Israel imposing Gaza siege. According to the report, Egypt had closed Rafah crossing 66% of the time in 2014, 100 days from the beginning of 2015 to May of the same year. As the world's attention has shifted away to other pressing issues, the report warned that, if the international community does not re-shoulder its responsibilities, Gaza will blow up into another war. The Euro-Mediterranean Human Rights Monitor urgently calls on the international community to take a practical steps to end the blockade on Gaza. The monitor also called the Egyptian government to open Rafah crossing, without any restrictions. Finally the monitor called for Support the Palestinian call for a commercial seaport in Gaza that guarantees the free import and export of goods and private international travel.

Non-Governmental organizations
Justus Weiner and Avi Bell of the pro-Israeli lobby group JCPA said that Israel's combat actions and blockade cannot be considered collective punishment. They cite Article 75(4)(b) of Protocol I Additional to the Geneva Conventions of 12 August 1949, which says the bar on collective punishment forbids the imposition of criminal-type penalties on individuals or groups on the basis of another's guilt, or the commission of acts that would otherwise violate the rules of distinction and/or proportionality. According to Weiner and Bell, the blockade does not "involve the imposition of criminal-type penalties or the violation of the rules of distinction and proportionality."

The Islamic Action Front (IAF), a Jordanian Islamist group, criticized Egypt for the blockade and accused it of "collaborating" with Israel and the United States. "The Egyptian authorities are ...increasing the suffering of the Palestinians in Gaza by building the steel wall and closing the border crossings with Gaza," said Hamzah Mansour, a member of the Shura Council of the IAF.

Gideon Rose of the Council on Foreign Relations has written that the blockade serves a secondary aim, which is to undermine Hamas by making life unpleasant for Gaza's residents.

Individuals
 Jimmy Carter – In June 2009, former President Jimmy Carter met with Hamas leaders in Gaza for three hours. Before his meeting with former Palestinian Prime Minister Ismail Haniyeh and other Hamas officials, President Carter spoke forcefully against the economic blockade of Gaza. "The responsibility for this terrible human rights crime lies in Jerusalem, Cairo, Washington, and throughout the international community. This abuse must cease; the crimes must be investigated; the walls must be brought down, and the basic right of freedom must come to you," Carter tells the crowd at an awards ceremony for UN refugee school pupils.
 Pope Benedict XVI – Pope Benedict during his visit to Bethlehem in May 2009 specifically mentioned the plight of Gazans, saying: "Please be assured of my solidarity with you in the immense work of rebuilding which now lies ahead and my prayers that the embargo will soon be lifted."
 Jimmy Carter and Mary Robinson in August 2014 at the height of the 2014 Israel–Gaza conflict called for a UN mandated lifting of the blockade.

International relief 
Following the 2014 Gaza War, a donors conference was held in Egypt where different countries committed to donate total sum of US$5.4 Billion. In September 2014, Turkey proposed sending a powership to Gaza to ease the shortage of electricity but in December 2014 Israel rejected the proposal stating that the infrastructure in Gaza was not compatible with the ship.

See also

 Criticism of the Israeli government
 History of Gaza
 Gaza–Israel conflict
 Palestinian rocket attacks on Israel
 Israel–Gaza barrier
 Egypt–Gaza barrier
 Egypt–Gaza border
 Legal assessments of the Gaza flotilla raid
 Egypt-Israel relations

Notes

References

External links
Gisha – Legal Center for Freedom of Movement
The Gaza Flotillas to Come: Some Ground Rules before Setting Out – Jerusalem Issues Brief
Guide: Gaza under blockade and Guide: Eased Gaza blockade – BBC
Gaza: 1.5 million people trapped in despair – International Committee of the Red Cross
– May 2010.htm Behind the Headlines: The Israeli humanitarian lifeline to Gaza – Israel Ministry of Foreign Affairs
LOCKED IN: THE HUMANITARIAN IMPACT OF TWO YEARS OF BLOCKADE ON THE GAZA STRIP – UNITED NATIONS Office for the Coordination of Humanitarian Affairs occupied Palestinian territory
San Remo Manual on International Law Applicable to Armed Conflicts at Sea, 12 June 1994
Partial List of Items Prohibited/Permitted into the Gaza Strip as of May 2010, Gisha
The Hard-Line on Grocery Items by Queen Rania of Jordan, The Huffington Post, 7 June 2010
Pressure Mounts On Israel To Ease Gaza Blockade – audio report by NPR, 16 June 2010
The EU and the Gaza Blockade by Esra Bulut and Carolin Goerzig – European Union Institute for Security Studies
"The Legal Basis of Israel's Naval Blockade of Gaza" by Ruth Lapidoth. The Jerusalem Center for Public Affairs. 13 March 2011.

Gaza Strip
Gaza–Israel conflict
Human rights in the Gaza Strip
Economy of the Gaza Strip
Egypt–Gaza border
Israel–Gaza Strip border
International sanctions
Gaza Strip
2007 in the Gaza Strip
2008 in the Gaza Strip
2009 in the Gaza Strip
2010 in the Gaza Strip
2011 in the Gaza Strip
2012 in the Gaza Strip
2013 in the Gaza Strip
2014 in the Gaza Strip
2015 in the Gaza Strip
2016 in the Gaza Strip
2017 in the Gaza Strip
2018 in the Gaza Strip
2019 in the Gaza Strip
2020 in the Gaza Strip
Articles containing video clips